The  Pù Hu bent-toed gecko (Cyrtodactylus puhuensis) is a species of gecko that is endemic to Vietnam.

References 

Cyrtodactylus
Reptiles described in 2014